Bijai Prasad was one of the eight nominees of the Leader of the Opposition to the Senate of Fiji after the 2006 elections. In 2014, he became Vice-President of the newly formed FijiFirst Party.  However, he quickly resigned due to an undisclosed criminal conviction.

References 

Fiji Labour Party politicians
Indian members of the Senate (Fiji)
Living people
Year of birth missing (living people)
Place of birth missing (living people)
FijiFirst politicians